Radek Příhoda (born 25 March 1974) is a Czech football referee. He has been a full international for FIFA since 2008.

References

External links
Radek Příhoda on WorldReferee.com

1974 births
Living people
Czech football referees